Princess of Thieves is a romantic adventure TV movie starring Keira Knightley, produced by Granada Productions in 2001 and first broadcast on The Wonderful World of Disney on ABC in the United States that same year. Co-starring in the film are Malcolm McDowell as the Sheriff, Jonathan Hyde as Prince John, Stuart Wilson as Robin Hood, Del Synnott as Froderick, and Stephen Moyer as Philip. The movie was directed by Peter Hewitt and filmed in Romania. The film's plotline draws inspiration from the classic Robin Hood legend, which has been adapted many times for screen.

Plot

Years after the "known" events of the Robin Hood legend, Robin's daughter, Gwyn (Keira Knightley) has grown up to be a strong-willed young woman, with a talent for archery, much like her father. As Maid Marian has died and Robin Hood (Stuart Wilson) is perpetually away battling in the Crusades, Gwyn has lived much of her life alone. Her only friend is the sweet but plain Froderick (Del Synnott), who clearly is in love with her. Upon the death of King Richard the Lionheart, Robin returns to see that the proper man takes Richard's place as King of England. Robin is quickly foiled and imprisoned by his enemies, the Sheriff of Nottingham (Malcolm McDowell) and Prince John (Jonathan Hyde).

It is then up to Gwyn to save the day. She must complete Robin's mission to find and protect the young Prince Philip (Stephen Moyer), who has just returned from exile in France to claim the throne – not an easy task since he has decided to forsake his true identity and is travelling anonymously under his valet's name (who died en route protecting his prince). Though she does fortuitously cross paths with the prince, she is not aware of his identity. With a romantic spark budding between them, they must find the Merry Men and join forces to free her father from the tortures of the Tower of London before the evil Prince John ascends to the throne and brings England to ruin. After freeing her father, Gwyn along with her father and Prince Philip stop the coronation of Prince John.

When Philip is about to be crowned as king, Gwyn with a heavy heart tells him that she can only serve and work for him, and they cannot be together. Robin later explains that he stayed out of Gwyn's life to protect her from the life he leads, but it did not make any difference because she grew up to be just like him. He then proposes a partnership between the two of them to serve Philip, with the only condition being that she take her orders from him (Robin) alone. She agrees, and at the end they are seen together leading Robin's men, side by side.

Characters
 Keira Knightley – Gwyn, the daughter of Robin Hood and Maid Marian
 Stephen Moyer – Prince Philip, illegitimate son of King Richard the Lionheart
 Stuart Wilson – Robin Hood
 Del Synnott – Froderick, a young man who has grown up with Gwyn; he is studying to be a churchman
 Malcolm McDowell – Sheriff of Nottingham, Robin Hood's mortal enemy
 Jonathan Hyde – Prince John, King Richard's younger brother who attempts to steal the throne of England
 Crispin Letts – Will Scarlett, Robin Hood's loyal friend and companion 
 Roger Ashton-Griffiths – Friar Tuck
 Hannah Cresswell - Maid Marian, the mother of Gwyn, and narrator

Production credits
 Director – Peter Hewitt
 Executive Producers – Susan B. Landau, Robert Rovner, Jon Cowan, Antony Root
 Art Director – Cristian Niculescu
 Second Unit Director – Mary Soan
 Composer (Music Score) – Rupert Gregson Williams
 Editor – Sue Wyatt
 Producer – Bill Leather
 Production Designer – Chris Roope
 Screenwriter – Robin Lerner

Reception
Scott Weinberg of eFilmCritic.com gave the film 4 stars, and wrote: ""Princess of Thieves" bucks all the odds by turning out to be an entertaining little movie."
Nix of BeyondHollywood.com was unexpectedly bored by the film despite expecting to like it; she concluded "The movie was made for a targeted audience -- teen girls under 12 -- and everyone else will be bored by it."

References

External links

 
 
 Princess of Thieves – Robin Hood Spotlight A review of the film and an analysis of historical and legendary background, including a feature on Robin Hood's children

2001 television films
2001 films
2000s adventure drama films
2001 romantic drama films
Adventure television films
Disney direct-to-video films
Films directed by Peter Hewitt
Robin Hood films
Films scored by Rupert Gregson-Williams
Cultural depictions of Richard I of England
Cultural depictions of John, King of England